36 Farmhouse is a 2022 Indian Hindi-language suspense comedy drama film. It is written by Subhash Ghai and directed by Ram Ramesh Sharma. It is produced by Subhash Ghai and Rahul Puri with the production houses Mukta Searchlight Films and Zee Studios. It stars Amol Parashar, Barkha Singh, Vijay Raaz, Sanjay Mishra and Flora Saini in pivotal roles. The film premiered on 21 January 2022 on ZEE5.

Cast 
 Vijay Raaz as Raunak Singh
 Madhuri Bhatia as Padmini Raj Singh
 Sanjay Mishra as JP (Jai Prakash)
 Amol Parashar as Harry, JP's son
 Ashwini Kalsekar as Benny
 Barkha Singh as Antara Raj Singh
 Flora Saini as Mithika Singh
 Rahul Singh as Gajendra Singh
 Pradeep Bajpai as Inspector Aditya Mane
 Liza Singh as Juhi

Soundtrack

Subhash Ghai has written the lyrics and he is the score composer for both the songs.

Release
ZEE5 has announced the launch of a trailer on 12 January 2022 and the film will be released on 21 January 2022.

Reception

Critical reviews 
First Post has rated the movie as embarrassingly bad. Outlook India too had a similar review, stating that Subhash Ghai is still making the movies of the 1980s.

Umesh Upadhyay of Dainik Bhaskar has given 3.5/5 stars stating that the film interestingly shows the title of thirty-six and the music of Subhash Ghai is also strong. Performance of Sanjay Mishra is good while Vijay Raaz's character Raunak Raj Singh looked weak. The dialogue writing has a big hand in it.

Archika Khurana of The Times of India has given 2.5/5 stars stating that it is a family drama which is predictable and is a light-hearted to watch. It is based on the concept of 'some steal for need, some steal for greed,' with the farmhouse's inheritance serving as the focal point of the tale. Cinematography explores the property from all angles within the one farmhouse. Sanjay Mishra's makes JP character the most memorable and funny character while other roles were convincing. Overall it is unhurried social commentary on greed, class disparity, family disputes and romance appear to be a half-baked effort.

Russel D'Silva of Bollywoodlife.com has given 3/5 stars stating that Subhash Ghai comes back to form in the OTT space with this Amol Parashar and Barkha Singh thriller. The writer and the director together they have shown a pretty decent thriller. It has boasts some good twists and turns, with the climax especially standing out. The performances of Sanjay Mishra and Vijay Raaz rise above the script by their several notches. Overall it is a good watch for a neat, smart and snappy thriller.

References

External links
 
 36 Farmhouse on ZEE5

2022 films
Indian comedy-drama films
2020s Hindi-language films
ZEE5 original films
2022 comedy-drama films